Landkreis Ludwigsburg is a Landkreis (district) in the middle of Baden-Württemberg, Germany. Neighboring districts are (from north clockwise) Heilbronn, Rems-Murr-Kreis, the district-free city Stuttgart, and the districts Böblingen and Enz-Kreis.

History
The district dates back to the Oberamt Ludwigsburg, which was created by the dukedom Württemberg in the beginning of the 19th century. After several small changes during the century, it was converted into a district in 1938. Several municipalities of the dissolved Oberämter Besigheim, Marbach and Waiblingen were added to the newly formed district.

As a result of the communal reform of 1973, the district gained about half of the dissolved district Vaihingen, and some few municipalities from the districts Backnang and Leonberg.

Geography
The main river in the district is the Neckar, which divides the district into a big western part and a smaller eastern part.

Partnerships
Starting in 1990 the district has a partnership with the district Chemnitzer Land (now part of the district of Zwickau) in Saxony. Even older is the partnership with the region Upper Galilee in Israel.
Since 1992 the district has a partnership with the Hungarian Komitat Pest, however the official signing of the partnership contract did take place in 2002. A friendship exists with the city Yichang in the province Hubei, China.

Coat of arms
The imperial eagle in the coat of arms is taken from the arms of the city  Markgröningen, which was an imperial city. It was later adopted by the city Ludwigsburg as well. The deer antler above the eagle is the symbol of Württemberg.

Towns and municipalities

References

External links

Official website 

 
Stuttgart (region)
Districts of Baden-Württemberg